Root carving is a traditional Chinese art form. It consists of carving and polishing tree roots into various artistic creations.

History
Carving of roots has been practiced since very early times; like many other artistic crafts, root carvings were originally produced in a primitive manner. The earliest root carvings are “辟邪” and “角形器”, showing up in the Warring States period.

In the Sui and Tang dynasties, root carving works not only prevailed in folk, but they were also cherished by the governing class. In the Tang dynasty, people laid emphasis on the natural forms of roots, cleverly taking advantage of the effect of corrosion and moth-eaten.

In the Song and Yuan dynasties, art of root carving not only developed in the court and folk, but also appeared in grottoes and temples. Roots were used to carve the statues of the Buddha, always comparing favorably with the clay.

Features

Root carving is widely said to preserve natural beauties present in the roots already.  Ancient and modern artists alike create lifelike, vivid works with a special technique using expression based on the roots' natural forms. 

Root carving is different from engraving, as it combines peculiarity with ingeniousness. Although its aesthetic principals share common ground with engraving, at the same time they are applied uniquely. The common ground is that they share expressive techniques of wood carving, sculpture, stone carving and so on, overcoming weaknesses by acquiring others strong points. The difference lies in the natural shape of roots. During the creative process, root carving mostly maintains the natural form of the root, adding some artificial polishing. In other words, root carving is guided by the inherent qualities of the root, rather than by strictly carving images.

Necessities

Creative effect achieved from the same material can vary from artist to artist. Within the field, three factors are generally considered of major importance.

Uniqueness of the root - To some degree, root carving is an act of discovery. Finding and working with a unique root is half of the task and requires experience and a keen aesthetic vision.

Cultural foundation - Rich cultural foundation, referring to the overall creative process, highlights the natural beauty of the root.

Craftsmanship - The natural beauty of roots can be realized from a fertile imagination and a high degree of composition.

References

Arts in China
Sculpture techniques
Woodworking